Marco Tecchio (born 31 August 1994 in Valdagno) is an Italian former professional cyclist, who rode professionally for  in 2014 and  in 2015 and 2016.

Major results

2015
 5th Overall Giro del Friuli-Venezia Giulia
 5th Tour of Almaty
 7th Trofeo Città di San Vendemiano
 9th Overall Ronde de l'Isard
 9th GP Laguna
2016
 1st Overall Tour of Bulgaria
1st Young rider classification
1st Stage 3
 1st Young rider classification Sibiu Cycling Tour
 3rd Trofeo Banca Popolare di Vicenza
 9th Gran Premio Palio del Recioto
 10th Memorial Marco Pantani

References

External links

1994 births
Living people
Italian male cyclists
People from Valdagno
Cyclists from the Province of Vicenza